Deep Green Resistance (DGR) is a radical environmental movement that views mainstream environmental activism as being ineffective. The group, which perceives the existence of industrial civilization itself as the greatest threat to the natural environment, strives for community organizing to build alternative food, housing, and medical institutions.<ref>"About Us". Deep Green Resistance. 2022.</ref> The organization advocates sabotage against infrastructure, which it views as necessary tactics to achieve its goal of dismantling industrial civilization. Religious and ecological scholar Todd LeVasseur classifies it as an apocalyptic or millenarian movement.

Beliefs
In the 2011 book Deep Green Resistance, the authors Lierre Keith, Derrick Jensen and Aric McBay state that civilization, particularly industrial civilization, is fundamentally unsustainable and must be actively and urgently dismantled in order to secure a future for all species on the planet.

The movement differentiates itself from bright green environmentalism, which is characterized by a focus on personal, technological, or government and corporate solutions, in that it holds these solutions as inadequate. DGR believes that lifestyle changes, such as using travel mugs and reusable bags and taking shorter showers, are too small for the large-scale environmental problems the world faces. It also states that the recent surge in environmentalism has become commercial in nature, and thus in itself has been industrialized. The movement asserts that per capita industrial waste produced is orders of magnitude greater than personal waste produced; therefore, it is industrialism that must be ended, and with that, lifestyle changes will follow.

DGR calls for the dismantling of industrial civilization, and the return to a pre-agricultural lifestyle.
In a piece for Earth Island, Max Wilbert, who says DGR believes 'agriculture is theft', welcomes the collapse of global grid power, and views electricity, whether generated by fossil fuels or lower emission technologies such as wind, solar or hydroelectric, as an enabler of industrial civilization's planet-threatening expansion.

Origins
A conference entitled "Deep Green Resistance: Confronting Industrial Culture" was organized by Keith in April, 2007, in Deerfield, Massachusetts.

Resistance tactics
The Deep Green perspective argues that the dominant culture, a term that encompasses all the cultures within globalized civilization, will not undergo a voluntary transformation to a sustainable way of living. This includes the movement's rejection of the feasibility of a slow and soft shift to sustainability. Members of the Deep Green movement believe that industrial civilization will inevitably collapse. This notion is based on historical examples of the collapse of major civilizations such as Rome or the Mayan civilization, and statistics regarding the current system's unsustainability. DGR maintains that humans must act decisively before the collapse to ensure the Earth that remains inhabitable for all organisms and that humans build a more sustainably structured society following the collapse. The founders of the Deep Green movement view technological solutions, no matter how well-intentioned, as unsatisfactory and argue that they could even lead to accelerated ecological destruction and pollution.

The organization advocates sabotage and violence, which it views as necessary tactics to achieve its goal of dismantling industrialized society and capitalism; as such, it can be classified as an apocalyptic or millenarian movement. Jensen stated in an interview on Democracy Now!: "I get accused of being the 'violence guy'... but I don’t ever think that's really fair, because I really consider myself the 'everything guy', that I want to put everything on the table and talk about all forms of resistance.... We can certainly parse out cases where we think it's appropriate to have militant response or non-militant response." Though the organization supports underground movements, it requires its members to adhere to a nonviolence pledge and operates as an aboveground movement only.

Criticism
A 2012 review of the 2011 DGR manifesto criticizes DGR's ideas as polarizing, elitist, extremist or asocial. Bron Taylor argues in Resistance: Do the Ends Justify the Means? that "radical tactics tend to be counterproductive" in winning over the general public. DGR co-founder Jensen states that if activists do not wish to participate in more militant acts of sabotage, they, at the very least, should prepare to set up local committees to reduce or channel violence expected to be wielded by the people in power in response to the eventual collapse of civilization. An article in Journal of Strategic Security describes the group as a "worrying bioterrorism threat", citing its strategy and propensity towards violence. Beginning in 2014, the FBI investigated Deep Green Resistance.

Anarcho-primitivists John Zerzan, Kevin Tucker and others criticize DGR's promotion of hierarchy in organizing an underground resistance, the code of conduct, the historical understanding of revolution and radical history, and the cult of personality around Jensen and Keith. Michelle Renée Matisons and Alexander Reid Ross of the Institute for Anarchist Studies have accused DGR of "emulating right-wing militia rhetoric, with the accompanying hierarchical vanguardism, personality cultism, and reactionary moralism."

Anti-trans views
DGR describes itself as a radical feminist organization, and has been described by critics as transphobic and TERF. The organisation has described hormone therapy for transgender youth as eugenics and excludes transgender women from women's spaces, while Keith has compared gender transitioning to mutilation. In 2012, founder McBay left the group, saying that it promoted transphobia. Earth First! Journal'' repudiated DGR in 2013 and said that it would "no longer print or in any way promote DGR material" because of its leaders' anti-transgender stances.

In 2019, Jensen, Keith, as well as DGR activist Max Wilbert published an article in Feminist Current saying "Hands up everyone who predicted that when Big Brother arrived, he’d be wearing a dress, hauling anyone who refuses to wax his ladyballs before a human rights tribunal, and bellowing ‘It’s Ma’am!’" In 2022, during the resistance to the Thacker Pass Lithium Mine, Indigenous group People of Red Mountain broke ties with attorney and DGR member Will Falk, citing transphobia as the reason. Other environmental groups involved in opposing the Thacker Pass project have distanced themselves from DGR. The organisation has also been criticised for its association with Jennifer Bilek, an investigative journalist who has, with antisemitic connotations, argued that transgender rights are a transhumanist conspiracy.

See also
Deep ecology
Ecofeminism
Eco-terrorism
Luddite
Radical environmentalism

References

Further reading

External links
Could climate change fuel eco terrorism?, Deutsche Welle 14.05.2020

Environmental organizations based in the United States
Deep ecology
Radical environmentalism
Simple living
Anti-consumerist groups
Anti-capitalism
Organizations that oppose transgender rights
Anarcho-primitivism